A code of silence is a condition in effect when a person opts to withhold what is believed to be vital or important information voluntarily or involuntarily.

Code of Silence may also refer to:

"Code of Silence", a song by Billy Joel from the 1986 album The Bridge
Code of Silence (1985 film), a 1985 film starring Chuck Norris
Code of Silence (2014 film), a 2014 Australian film
Code of Silence (2015 film), a 2015 Nigerian film
Code of Silence (2021 film), a 2021 British film
"Code of Silence" (Arrow)